Anastassiya Slonova (born 1991) is a Kazakhstani cross-country skier.

At the 2011 Asian Winter Games she was part of the winning Kazakhstani team on the 4 × 5 kilometre relay, together with Elena Kolomina, Oxana Yatskaya and Svetlana Malahova-Shishkina.

She competed at the FIS Nordic World Ski Championships 2011 in Oslo.

References

1991 births
Living people
Kazakhstani female cross-country skiers
Cross-country skiers at the 2014 Winter Olympics
Olympic cross-country skiers of Kazakhstan
Asian Games medalists in cross-country skiing
Cross-country skiers at the 2011 Asian Winter Games
Asian Games gold medalists for Kazakhstan
Medalists at the 2011 Asian Winter Games
Universiade medalists in cross-country skiing
Universiade gold medalists for Kazakhstan
Universiade silver medalists for Kazakhstan
Competitors at the 2015 Winter Universiade
21st-century Kazakhstani women